Jean-Paul Giachino (born 3 January 1963) is a French biathlete. He competed in the 20 km individual event at the 1988 Winter Olympics.

References

1963 births
Living people
French male biathletes
Olympic biathletes of France
Biathletes at the 1988 Winter Olympics
Place of birth missing (living people)